Cochylimorpha razowskiana is a species of moth of the family Tortricidae. It is found in China (Beijing, Gansu, Hebei, Henan, Ningxia, Qinghai, Shanxi, Shaanxi) and Russia.

References

 

R
Moths of Asia
Moths described in 2005